The Rock of Vergisson is a limestone peak in Saône-et-Loire, France.

Geography 

The Rock of Vergisson is a sharp escarpment located in the commune of Vergisson in Saône-et-Loire, in the south of Bourgogne. It is less than 2 km as the crow flies from the Rock of Solutré. It is 485 metres high, about 8 metres shorter than its neighbour.

Geology and History 
The Rock of Vergisson has the same geological origins as the Rock of Solutré: a coral plateau from the Mesozoic era, raised and tilted from the east during the Cenozoic era, and exposed by differential erosion.

During prehistoric times, the rock was a site of habitation, while the neighboring Rock of Solutré was a hunting site.

Activity

Viticulture 
Vineyards enclosed by dry stone walls (French: murgers) can be found on the slopes of the rock, producing wines of the Pouilly-Fuissé and Mâcon-Vergisson denominations.

Environmental protection 
The area including the Rocks of Solutré and Vergisson and Mont Pouilly has been classified as a site naturel et rural since 1955.

Sport 

The limestone cliffs of the rocks are, along with the cliff at Remigny, one of the two most important sights for climbing in the departement, with more than 122 identified routes. Every year, the Randonnée des deux Roches (walk of the two rocks) takes place, which runs from Solutré to Vergisson. In 1992, François Mitterrand decided to climb the Rock of Vergisson to escape from journalists.

The rocks of  Solutré and Vergisson were described by Alphonse de Lamartine as deux navires pétrifiés surplombant une mer de vignes (two petrified ships overlooking a sea of vineyards).

References

Escarpments of Europe
Landforms of Saône-et-Loire